The 1996 Rexona Cup – Singles was a tennis event played on outdoor clay courts at the Am Rothenbaum in Hamburg in Germany that was part of Tier II of the 1996 WTA Tour. The 1996 Rexona Cup tournament was held from April 29 through May 5, 1996.

Gigi Fernández and Martina Hingis were the defending champions but lost in the final 4–6, 7–6, 6–4 against Arantxa Sánchez Vicario and Brenda Schultz-McCarthy.

Seeds
Champion seeds are indicated in bold text while text in italics indicates the round in which those seeds were eliminated. The top two seeded teams received byes into the quarterfinals.

 Arantxa Sánchez Vicario /  Brenda Schultz-McCarthy (champions)
 Gigi Fernández /  Martina Hingis (final)
 Conchita Martínez /  Patricia Tarabini (semifinals)
 Kristie Boogert /  Miriam Oremans (semifinals)

Draw

External links
 ITF tournament edition details

1996 WTA Tour
WTA German Open